Lee Artis Woodall (born October 31, 1969) is a former professional American football player who was selected by the San Francisco 49ers in the sixth round of the 1994 NFL Draft. A 6'1", 230-lb. linebacker from West Chester University, Woodall played in 8 NFL seasons from 1994 to 2001. He was a rookie for the 49ers during the 1994 season when they beat the San Diego Chargers 49–26 in Super Bowl XXIX. A personal highlight was a fumble return for 96 yards in 1995 in a win against the Buffalo Bills. Selected to the Pro Bowl in 1995 and 1997; his last NFL season was in 2001 with the Denver Broncos. He made a last attempt to play football by signing with the Toronto Argonauts of the CFL in March 2006. Lee is married to Terri Matthews, Emmy Nominated, Best Selling Author, International Speaker and Respected Business Woman. Lee and Terri work together in ministry.

References

 http://www.ninersnation.com/2011/4/20/2122172/49ers-top-10-nfl-draft-successes-no-8-lee-woodall-outside-linebacker

1969 births
Living people
American football linebackers
San Francisco 49ers players
Carolina Panthers players
Denver Broncos players
National Conference Pro Bowl players
West Chester Golden Rams football players
People from Carlisle, Pennsylvania
Players of American football from Pennsylvania